Brenda Stanley (born February 10, 1952) is an American politician and former educator serving as a member of the Oklahoma Senate from the 42nd district. Elected in November 2018, she assumed office on January 14, 2019.

Early life and education 
Stanley was raised in Duluth, Georgia. She earned a Bachelor of Science degree in education from Georgia College, a Bachelor of Science in administration from the University of Central Oklahoma, and a Master of Education from the University of Georgia.

Career 
Stanley worked as a teacher and school principal until retiring in 2016. She also worked as an adjunct professor at University of Central Oklahoma and a project manager at Rose State College. Stanley was elected to the Oklahoma Senate in November 2018 and assumed office on January 14, 2019.

References

External links

Living people
1952 births
Georgia College & State University alumni
University of Central Oklahoma alumni
University of Georgia alumni
University of Central Oklahoma faculty
Republican Party Oklahoma state senators
Women state legislators in Oklahoma
People from Duluth, Georgia
21st-century American politicians
21st-century American women politicians